Loznoy is a rural locality (a khutor) in Nizhnegnutovskoye Rural Settlement, Chernyshkovsky District, Volgograd Oblast, Russia. The population was 313 as of 2010. There are 9 streets.

Geography 
Loznoy is located on Don Plain, 54 km southeast of Chernyshkovsky (the district's administrative centre) by road. Nizhnegnutov is the nearest rural locality.

References 

Rural localities in Chernyshkovsky District